Hi-Lo may refer to:

Vehicles
 A regional term for a forklift, an industrial truck used to lift and move materials short distances
 Hi-Lo, a brand of travel trailer whose upper half rolls down over its lower half to reduce wind resistance during travel

Card games
 High-low split, a poker variant
 Hi-Lo, a type of card counting
 Hi-Lo (High Low), a card game where players guess if a certain face-up card is higher or lower in value than a certain face-down card

Entertainment
 Hi-Lo, a 2000 album by Irish rock band The Walls
 HI-LO, an alias of the Dutch producer Oliver Heldens
"Hi-Lo", song by Evanescence from the album Synthesis
 "Hi Lo" (The Price Is Right), a pricing game on the American game show The Price Is Right
 The Hi-Lo's, an American singing group formed in 1953
 HiLo, an album by American singer/songwriter Jack Stauber

Other
 Hi-lo, a type of hemline
 Hi/Lo algorithm a database key generation algorithm

See also 
 Hilo (disambiguation)
 High Low (disambiguation)